Chah Hanan (also Romanized as Chāh Ḩanān; also known as Chāhanan, Chāhenon, Chāh Nan, and Chāhnon) is a village in Bondar Rural District, Senderk District, Minab County, Hormozgan Province, Iran. At the 2006 census, its population was 309, in 79 families.

References 

Populated places in Minab County